Porthgain (Welsh for fair/beautiful port or more likely 'chisel port' from the Welsh 'porth' meaning port and 'gaing' meaning chisel as used by the many slate workers there after the port was built and became operational in the early 19th Century) is a hamlet in the Pembrokeshire Coast National Park in Wales, located between St David's and Goodwick, and just west of Llanrhian.

History & amenities 
The village of Porthgain has historical relics from its time as a prosperous industrial harbour in the early 1900s.

At one time, the harbour exported slate from quarries a few miles south at Abereiddi, Trwynllwyd and Porthgain quarry works  itself. Abereiddi and the quarries to the South were linked by a tramway, the Porthgain Railway. Water-powered mills at Porthgain sawed the quarried slate slabs before shipment.

In later years the slate trade was abandoned, although Porthgain survived by turning to brickmaking, and later to crushed roadstone. Large brick hoppers dominate the harbour. These hoppers were used to store crushed dolerite  before shipment and are now a Scheduled Ancient Monument. Slate, from a local quarry, was handled through the harbour from 1850 to 1910. Bricks were made in the harbour area from 1889 to 1912 using waste from the slate operation. The crushed dolerite (1889–1931) was used as a road stone.

In the 1980s Porthgain was designated as a conservation area and the industrial properties and land were purchased by local residents and the Pembrokeshire Coast National Park Authority.

The harbour, still home to local fishermen, can get very busy in the summer with recreational boaters. Locally caught crab & lobster are available to buy from “The red house” opposite the road into Porthgain. Other attractions and conveniences include the Pembrokeshire Coast Path rambling up both sides of the harbour, the “Strumble Shuttle” bus, and the Sloop, which used to be called the “Step In” when boats were able to dock beside the pub and the crews could step in. Porthgain also has the Shed , a small bistro situated by the Quay and the Harbour Lights Gallery, which is located in the manager's office of the old works.

Porthgain Kayak Club operates voyages from the harbour during the summer months.

See also 
 Porthgain Railway

References

External links 

 National Park Authority
 www.geograph.co.uk : photos of Porthgain and surrounding area

Beaches of Pembrokeshire
Coast of Pembrokeshire
Villages in Pembrokeshire
Seaside resorts in Wales
Populated coastal places in Wales